Patience Torlowei (born 24 July 1964) is a Nigerian fashion designer. She is the creator of the "Esther Dress", the first piece of couture ever to join the Smithsonian Institution's National Museum of African Art's permanent collection.

Early life
Born in Enugu to Ijaw parents, Torlowei graduated from the Textile Arts and Technology faculty at the Yaba College of Technology. She moved to Belgium in 1989. As a fashion designer she has worked to create bridal clothes and lingerie as well as ready-to-wear attire. She founded her fashion line, Patience Please, in 2006.

Career 
A dress designed by Torlowei, Esther, is currently owned by the National Museum of African Art (NMAA) in Washington, D.C.; it is the first piece of haute couture to enter the museum collection. It depicts scenes of oil and diamond extraction and of war, and is made of a variety of materials including gold fabric. The piece had been previously featured in a fashion show at the museum in 2014. Torlowei was included in the 2019 show "I Am… Contemporary Women Artists of Africa" at the NMAA.

See also 
 Fashion in Nigeria
 Lingerie
List of 20th-century women artists

References

External links
The dress comes out of pain: Patience Torlowei creates fashion from the highs and lows of modern Africa Washington Post, August 22, 2019 (with photos of the "Esther Dress")

1964 births
Living people
Nigerian fashion designers
Nigerian women fashion designers
Nigerian women artists
21st-century Nigerian artists
21st-century women artists
Yaba College of Technology alumni
Nigerian expatriates in Belgium
People from Bayelsa State